Obovaria subrotunda, common name the round hickorynut,  is a species of freshwater mussel, an aquatic bivalve mollusk in the family Unionidae, the river mussels.

Distribution and conservation status 

This species is native to eastern North America.

The Canadian Species at Risk Act listed it in the List of Wildlife Species at Risk as being endangered in Canada.

References

Bivalves described in 1820
subrotunda
Molluscs of the United States
Molluscs of Canada
Taxa named by Constantine Samuel Rafinesque
Taxonomy articles created by Polbot